This article presents an overview of the Sports in Vietnam.

Team sports

Football

Association football in Vietnam is run by the Vietnam Football Federation. The federation administers the Vietnam national football team, as well as the V-League, Vietnam First Division, Vietnam Second Division, and the Vietnamese League Three.

Football is the most popular sport in Vietnam. Its annual V-League competition has taken place since 1980 (except in 1988 and 1999).

When Vietnam was split into North Vietnam and South Vietnam, two national teams existed. The North Vietnamese national team was not very active, playing almost exclusively against other Communist countries between 1956 and 1966, while the South Vietnamese national team took part in the first two AFC Asian Cup finals, finishing fourth place both times.

Futsal

Futsal came to Vietnam in 1990s and now become more developing after having struggling in early time. The Vietnam national futsal team had its most notable result in 2016 when they finish fourth place at the 2016 AFC Futsal Championship which gained it qualified for 2016 FIFA Futsal World Cup where they reached to round of 16. They reached to round of 16 again in 2021.

Vietnam also has futsal league call Futsal V-League that has been run since 2007. Thái Sơn Nam is the most successful club. They are also one of the most strongest clubs in Asia, having reaching the final of 2018 AFC Futsal Club Championship and finish third place at 2015, 2017 and 2019.

Basketball
Basketball has become an increasingly popular sport in Vietnam, especially in Ho Chi Minh City, Hanoi and Soc Trang.
 	
The Vietnamese national basketball team had its most notable finish at the 2019 Southeast Asian Games when it earned the bronze medal.

Volleyball 
The National volleyball team repeatedly won silver medals at the Southeast Asian Games.

Australian Rules Football

Australian rules football has been played in Vietnam since 1998, when the Saigan Saints was formed by expatriate Australians. It was followed shortly after by new rivals the Hanoi Hawks, also established by Australian expatriates. The Saigan Saints stopped playing in 2001.

In 2003, Australian rules football was reborn in Hanoi under the Hanoi Swans banner with a tri-nations tournament against Hong Kong and Thailand. In 2007, a movement started in Saigan to get footy up again with the goal of combining with Hanoi to form a national team, the Vietnam Swans.

In July 2007, the Vietnam Swans played together for the first time in Bangkok for the 8th Annual Asian Championships. They returned to the Asian Championships in 2008 in Singapore and have been playing ever since.

In 2009, highlights included the ANZAC Day Match against the Thailand Tigers at Hellfire Pass on the Death Burma Railway; a Black Saturday Tribute Match and Fundraiser against the Bali Geckos a match against HMAS Darwin and the Asian Championships.

Cricket

Rugby union

Rugby union in Vietnam is a minor but growing sport.

Rugby union was originally introduced when Vietnam was part of French Indochina, but this was mainly by French expatriates. After independence there was a long hiatus, as financial and political forces, from famine to the Vietnam War meant it was impossible for the game to be played.

As with many minor rugby nations, the sport is centered in the national capital.

The Indochinese Cup was established in 1999, as a four sided tournament between Vietnamese teams from Saigon and Hanoi, Vientiane (Laos), and Phnom Penh (Cambodia).

The historical connection with France is a mixed blessing. A number of people who could qualify for Vietnam's national rugby union team play in France. An example is the MHRC player François Trinh-Duc, who has a Vietnamese grandfather.

Individual sports

Badminton

Tennis

Running

Athletics
Bui Thi Nhung and Vu Thi Huong are the two main athletes from Vietnam.

Bui Thi Nhung won the gold medal at the 2003 Asian Athletics Championships, and finished 4th at the 2006 Asian Games. Bui Thi Nhung also competed at the 2004 Summer Olympics without reaching the final.

Vu Thi Huong is a track and field sprint athlete who competes internationally for Vietnam.

Huong won the silver medal in women's 100m event and the bronze medal in women's 200m event at the 2007 Asian Athletics Championship in Amman, Jordan.

At recent Southeast Asian Games editions, she has been dominating the short distances. She won the double (both 100m and 200m) gold medal at the 2007 Southeast Asian Games in Thailand, and the 100m gold and 200m silver at the 2005 Southeast Asian Games in the Philippines. At the first SEA Games in her career (2003 in Vietnam), she won bronze medal in the 100m and silver medal in the 4x100 relay with the Vietnam team.

Huong represented Vietnam at the 2008 Summer Olympics in Beijing. She competed at the 100m sprint and placed third in her first round heat, after Kim Gevaert and Yulia Nestsiarenka in a time of 11.65 seconds. She qualified for the second round in which she failed to qualify for the semi-finals as her time of 11.70 seconds was the 8th and slowest time of her race.

Chess
Vietnam is home to many chess players who compete internationally, among the well known being Cesar Boutteville, Hoang Thanh Trang, Lê Quang Liêm, Nguyen Ngoc Truong Son, and Paul Truong.

Martial arts

More than 70 years later, most of the Vietnamese martial arts schools worldwide emerging from Vo Co Truyen's development practice Vo Thuat:
 Van Vo Dao (Vo Su Kinh Chu)
 Vo Vietnam (Nguyen Duc Moc)
 Vo Thuat (Nguyen Van Trung)
 Vo Binh Dinh/Tay Son Binh Dinh (Thanh Long)
 Minh Long (Tran Minh Long)
 Kim Long (Nguyen Trung Hoa)
 Vovinam Viet Vo Dao (Nguyen Loc)
 Nhat Nam (Ngo Xuan Bing)
 Tay Son Nhan (Vo Su To Dinh Thanh)
 Lam Chanh Tong
 Viet Dao Quan (Giao Su Tien Si Dang Quang Luong)

In Vietnam, many people also practice:
 Vo Co Truyen
 Thieu Lam Viet Nam
 Kim Ke-Tay Son Nhan
 Phakwondo (Hoa Quyen Dao)
 Hong Gia Viet Nam
 Nam Huynh Dao
 Lam Son

Also there are various Sino-Vietnamese styles. These are styles that are only partially Vietnamese which were popular among Chinese who lived in Vietnam, for example:
 Thieu Lam (Shaolinquan)
 Noi Quyen (Neiquan)
 Bach My Phai (Baimeipai, Baimeiquan)

Other styles include:
 Mai Hoa Quyen (Meihuaquan)
 Sa Long Cuong
 Quan Khi Dao

Vovinam and Nhat Nam are the main Vietnamese martial arts, followed by others.

See also
 Vietnam at the Olympics

References